The Pekulney Range is a range of mountains in far North-eastern Russia. Administratively the range is part of the Chukotka Autonomous Okrug of the Russian Federation. The area of the range is desolate and uninhabited.

The term "Pekulney" means "knife mountain" in the Chukchi language.

Geography
The Pekulney Range is a southern prolongation of the Chukotka Mountains, part of the East Siberian System of ranges. 
It is limited to the west by the Anadyr Highlands with the Osinov Range, and the Belaya River with its tributary Bolshaya Osinovaya. To the east the range is bound by the valley of the Tanyurer River. Both the rivers limiting the range to the west and to the east are flowing southwards. At its southern end the range reaches the Anadyr Lowland.

There are four cirque glaciers on the mountains of the range, as well as some perennial snow fields, with a total area not exceeding .

Flora
The Pekulney Range has a barren look. At higher elevations there is only rocky mountain tundra. The climate of the area is subarctic.

References

Landforms of Siberia
Chukotka Mountains